Starlight is an unincorporated community in Wood Township, Clark County, Indiana, United States.  Addresses in Starlight are listed as part of nearby Borden.

History
A post office was established at Starlight in 1892, and remained in operation until it was discontinued in 1902. According to tradition, Starlight was named when a new light fixture in the local store shined like a bright star.

Geography

Attractions
Starlight is best known for two large farms which are open to the public year-round as tourist attractions. The farms offer customers the chance to pick their own fruits and vegetables, primarily apples and strawberries, or already-harvested produce. The two farms — Huber's Orchard & Winery and Joe Huber Family Farm & Restaurant  — have expanded over the years from simple "you-pick" operations to full-fledged attractions, with restaurants, petting zoos, winery and live entertainment. The farms offer visitors from nearby Louisville, Kentucky, and surrounding areas a chance to experience "a day in the country." The two farms are separate business however the owners are distantly related.

Starlight hosts a popular annual Starlight Strawberry Festival, held on Memorial Day weekend and sponsored by the local Roman Catholic parish.

See also
List of attractions and events in the Louisville metropolitan area

References

External links

 Joe Huber Family Farm & Restaurant
 Huber's Orchard & Winery
 St. John the Baptist, Roman Catholic Church

Unincorporated communities in Clark County, Indiana
Unincorporated communities in Indiana
Louisville metropolitan area
1892 establishments in Indiana
Populated places established in 1892